Hans Ziegler (1879–1961) was a German-born Austrian stage director and stage actor. He also acted in around a dozen films spread out through his long career.

Selected filmography
 A Waltz by Strauss (1925)
 The Other Life (1948)
 1. April 2000 (1952)
 Sissi – Fateful Years of an Empress (1957)

References

Bibliography 
 Ernesto G. Laura. Tutti i film di Venezia, 1932-1984. La Biennale, Settore cinema e spettacolo televisivo, 1985.

External links 
 

1879 births
1961 deaths
Austrian male television actors
Austrian male film actors
Austrian male stage actors
German male television actors
German male film actors
German male stage actors
Actors from Karlsruhe
German emigrants to Austria